Lindsey Olin Graham (born July 9, 1955) is an American lawyer and politician serving as the senior United States senator from South Carolina, a seat he has held since 2003. A member of the Republican Party, Graham chaired the Senate Committee on the Judiciary from 2019 to 2021.

A native of Central, South Carolina, Graham received his Juris Doctor degree from the University of South Carolina School of Law in 1981. Most of his active duty during his military service happened from 1982 to 1988, when he served with the Judge Advocate General's Corps in the United States Air Force, as a defense attorney and then with the Air Force's chief prosecutor in Europe, based in West Germany. Later his entire service in the U.S. Air Force Reserve ran concurrently with his congressional career. He was awarded a Bronze Star Medal for meritorious service in 2014 and held the rank of colonel.

Graham worked as a lawyer in private practice before serving one term in the South Carolina House of Representatives from 1993 to 1995. He served four terms in the United States House of Representatives for South Carolina's 3rd congressional district from 1995 to 2003. In 2002, Graham won the U.S. Senate seat vacated by retiring Republican incumbent Strom Thurmond. He was reelected to a fourth term in 2020. In the Senate Graham advocates for strong national defense and aggressive interventionist foreign policy. Initially, he was known for his willingness to be bipartisan and work with Democrats on issues like campaign finance reform, a ban on waterboarding, cap and trade, immigration reform, and judicial nominees. He has criticized the Tea Party movement, arguing for a more inclusive Republican Party.

Graham sought the Republican nomination for president between June and December 2015, dropping out before the 2016 Republican primaries began. He was an outspoken critic of Donald Trump's 2016 candidacy and repeatedly said he did not support Trump; in particular, he took issue with Trump's comments on Graham's close friend, Senator John McCain. After a March 2017 meeting with Trump, Graham became a staunch ally of his, often issuing public statements in his defense. His reversal caught both parties by surprise and sparked media speculation. He became chairman of the Senate Judiciary Committee in January 2019, and led the U.S. Supreme Court confirmation hearings for Amy Coney Barrett, who was confirmed in October 2020.

Early life
Lindsey Olin Graham was born in Central, South Carolina, where his parents, Millie (Walters) and Florence James "F.J." Graham, ran a restaurant/bar/pool hall/liquor store, the Sanitary Cafe. His family is of Scots-Irish descent. After graduating from D. W. Daniel High School, Graham became the first member of his family to attend college, and joined the Reserve Officers' Training Corps. When he was 21, his mother died of Hodgkin's lymphoma, aged 52, and his father died 15 months later of a heart attack, aged 69. Because his then-13-year-old sister was left orphaned, the service allowed Graham to attend the University of South Carolina in Columbia so he could remain near home as his sister's legal guardian. During his studies, he became a member of the Pi Kappa Phi social fraternity.

He graduated from the University of South Carolina with a B.A. in psychology in 1977, and from the University of South Carolina School of Law with a J.D. in 1981.

Military service

Upon graduating from the University of South Carolina School of Law, Graham was commissioned as an officer in the Judge Advocate General's Corps (JAG Corps) in the United States Air Force in 1982 and began active duty that year. His duty began with a stint as an Air Force defense attorney, after which he was transferred to Rhein-Main Air Base in Frankfurt, Germany, where from 1984 to 1988 he was the Air Force's chief prosecutor in Europe. In 1984, as he was defending an Air Force pilot accused of using marijuana, he was featured in an episode of 60 Minutes that exposed the Air Force's defective drug-testing procedures. After his service in Europe, he returned to South Carolina, leaving active duty in 1989 and entering private practice as a lawyer. He served as assistant county attorney for Oconee County from 1988 to 1992 and city attorney for Central from 1990 to 1994.

After leaving the Air Force, Graham joined the South Carolina Air National Guard in 1989, where he served until 1995, then joining the U.S. Air Force Reserve.

During the 1990–91 Gulf War, Graham was recalled to active duty, serving as a judge advocate at McEntire Air National Guard Station in Eastover, South Carolina, where he helped brief departing pilots on the laws of war. In 1998, the Capitol Hill daily newspaper The Hill contended that Graham was describing himself on his website as an Operation Desert Shield and Desert Storm veteran. Graham responded: "I have not told anybody I'm a combatant. I'm not a war hero, and never said I was. ... If I have lied about my military record, I'm not fit to serve in Congress", further noting that he "never deployed".

In 1998, Graham was promoted to lieutenant colonel. In 2004, he received his promotion to colonel in the U.S. Air Force Reserve at a White House ceremony officiated by President George W. Bush. That year, a lower court determined that Graham's service as a military judge while a sitting member of the Senate was acceptable. In 2006, the Court of Appeals for the Armed Forces set aside the lower court's ruling after concluding it was improper for Graham to serve as a military judge.

In 2007, Graham served in Iraq as a reservist on active duty for a short period in April and for two weeks in August, where he worked on detainee and rule-of-law issues. He also served in Afghanistan during the August 2009 Senate recess. He was then assigned as a senior instructor at the Judge Advocate General's School, though he never went.

In 2014, Graham received a Bronze Star medal for meritorious service as a senior legal adviser to the Air Force in Iraq and Afghanistan from August 2009 to July 2014, overseeing the detention of military prisoners. In 2015, he retired at his last rank of Colonel from the Air Force with over 33 total years of service, after reaching the statutory retirement age of 60 for his rank. Graham earned points toward a military pension but was unpaid as an Air Force officer while a congressman and senator as he was ineligible for a military paycheck during his time in federal government service.

South Carolina House of Representatives
In 1992, Graham was elected to the South Carolina House of Representatives from the 2nd district, in Oconee County. He defeated Democratic incumbent Lowell W. Ross by 60% to 40% and served one term, from 1993 to 1995.

U.S. House of Representatives

Elections
In 1994, 20-year incumbent Democratic U.S. Congressman Butler Derrick of South Carolina's northwestern-based 3rd congressional district decided to retire. Graham ran to succeed him and, with Republican U.S. Senator Strom Thurmond campaigning on his behalf, won the Republican primary with 52% of the vote, defeating Bob Cantrell (33%) and Ed Allgood (15%). In the general election, Graham defeated Democratic State Senator James Bryan Jr., 60% to 40%. As a part of that year's Republican Revolution, Graham became the first Republican to represent the district since 1877.

In 1996, he was challenged by Debbie Dorn, the niece of Butler Derrick and daughter of Derrick's predecessor, 13-term Democratic Congressman William Jennings Bryan Dorn. Graham was reelected, defeating Dorn 60% to 40%. In 1998, he was reelected to a third term unopposed. In 2000, he was reelected to a fourth term, defeating Democratic nominee George Brightharp, 68% to 30%.

Tenure

In 1997, Graham took part in a leadership challenge against House Speaker Newt Gingrich.

In November 1997, Graham was one of 18 House Republicans to co-sponsor a resolution by Bob Barr that sought to launch an impeachment inquiry into President Bill Clinton. The resolution did not specify any charges or allegations. This was an early effort to impeach Clinton, predating the eruption of the Clinton–Lewinsky scandal. The eruption of that scandal ultimately led to a more serious effort to impeach Clinton in 1998. On October 8, 1998, Graham voted in favor of legislation to open an impeachment inquiry. He was a member of the Judiciary Committee, which conducted the inquiry. In both the Judiciary Committee vote on forwarding proposed articles of impeachment, and the full House vote on the proposed articles of impeachment, Graham voted for three of the four proposed articles of impeachment. He voted against the second count of perjury in the Paula Jones case. This made him the only Republican on the Judiciary Committee to vote against any of the proposed articles of impeachment. During the inquiry, Graham asked, "Is this Watergate or Peyton Place?" The House passed two of the impeachment articles. Graham served as an House impeachment manager in the impeachment trial.

Committee assignments

During his service in the House, Graham served on the following committees:
 Committee on International Relations (1995–1998)
 Committee on Education and the Workforce (1995–2002)
 Committee on the Judiciary (1997–2002)
 Committee on Armed Services (1999–2002)

U.S. Senate

Elections

2002

In 2002, longtime U.S. Senator Strom Thurmond decided to retire. Graham ran to succeed him and won the Republican primary unopposed. In the general election, he defeated Democratic nominee Alex Sanders, the former President of the College of Charleston and former Chief Judge of the South Carolina Court of Appeals, 600,010 votes (54%) to 487,359 (44%). Graham thus became South Carolina's first new U.S. senator since Fritz Hollings in 1966.

2008

When Graham ran for a second term in 2008, he was challenged in the Republican primary by National Executive Committeeman of the South Carolina Republican Party, Buddy Witherspoon. Graham defeated him by 186,398 votes (66.82%) to 92,547 (33.18%), winning all but one of South Carolina's 46 counties. He then defeated the Democratic nominee, pilot and engineer Bob Conley, in the general election, 1,076,534 votes (57.53%) to 790,621 (42.25%), having outspent Conley by $6.6 million to $15,000.

2014

Of all the Republican senators up for reelection in 2014, Graham was considered one of the most vulnerable to a primary challenge, largely due to his low approval ratings and reputation for working with and compromising with Democrats. He expected a primary challenge from conservative activists, including the Tea Party movement, and Chris Chocola, President of the Club for Growth, indicated that his organization would support a primary challenge if an acceptable standard-bearer emerged.

But a serious challenger to Graham failed to emerge and he was widely viewed as likely to win, which has been ascribed to his "deft maneuvering" and "aggressive" response to the challenge. He befriended potential opponents from the state's congressional delegation and helped them with fundraising and securing their preferred committee assignments; he assembled a "daunting multi-million-dollar political operation" dubbed the "Graham machine" that built six regional offices across the state and enlisted the support of thousands of paid staffers and volunteers, including over 5,000 precinct captains; he assembled a "staggering" campaign war chest and "blanketed" the state with positive ads; he focused on constituent services and local issues; and he refused to "pander" to the Tea Party supporters, instead confronting them head-on, arguing that the Republican Party needed to be more inclusive.

In the run-up to the Republican primary, Graham's approval rating improved. According to a February 2013 Winthrop poll, he had a 59% positive rating among likely Republican voters. Graham won the June 10 primary with 178,833 votes (56.42%). His nearest challenger, State Senator Lee Bright, received 48,904 (15.4%).

Graham won the general election, defeating the Democratic nominee, State Senator Brad Hutto, 54% to 39%. Independent Thomas Ravenel (a former Republican State Treasurer) and Libertarian Victor Kocher received 3.8% and 2.7% of the vote, respectively.

2020

Democrat Jaime Harrison challenged Graham in the 2020 Senate election. The race was unexpectedly competitive, with many polls in the last few months of the race showing it as very close. Harrison also had record fundraising numbers. Despite this, Graham defeated Harrison by over ten percentage points, 54.4% to 44.2%, in the November 3 general election.

Committee assignments
In November 2018, Senator Chuck Grassley, chair of the Senate Judiciary Committee, announced that he would become chair of the Senate Finance Committee, and that Graham would take his place as chair of the Judiciary Committee, pending his formal selection by colleagues.

Current
 Committee on Appropriations
 Subcommittee on Commerce, Justice, Science, and Related Agencies
 Subcommittee on Defense
 Subcommittee on Energy and Water Development
 Subcommittee on Labor, Health and Human Services, Education, and Related Agencies
 Subcommittee on the Department of State, Foreign Operations, and Related Programs (Ranking Member)
 Subcommittee on Transportation, Housing and Urban Development, and Related Agencies
 Committee on Environment and Public Works
 Subcommittee on Chemical Safety, Waste Management, Environmental Justice and Regulatory Oversight
 Clean Air, Climate and Nuclear Safety
 Transportation and Infrastructure
 Committee on the Budget (Ranking Member, 2021–present)
 Committee on the Judiciary
Subcommittee on Antitrust, Competition Policy and Consumer Rights
 Subcommittee on the Constitution, Civil Rights and Human Rights
 Subcommittee on Crime and Terrorism 
 Subcommittee on Privacy, Technology and the Law

Previous
 Committee on Armed Services (2003–2019)
 Committee on Health, Education, Labor and Pensions (2003–2005)
 Committee on Agriculture, Nutrition and Forestry (2007–2009)
 Select Committee on Intelligence (2007–2009)
 Committee on Veterans' Affairs (2007–2011)
 Committee on Homeland Security and Governmental Affairs (2009–2011)
 Special Committee on Aging (2009–2013)
 Committee on Foreign Relations (2019–2021)

Caucus memberships
 International Conservation Caucus
 Senate National Guard Caucus (Co-chair)
 Sportsmen's Caucus
 Senate Oceans Caucus

Graham is a member of the board of directors of the International Republican Institute.

Relationship with Donald Trump 

In July 2015, when Graham was a presidential candidate, he called Donald Trump, then another presidential candidate, a "jackass" for saying that Graham's close friend, Senator John McCain, was "not a war hero." Trump reacted by calling Graham an "idiot" and revealing Graham's personal cellphone number at a campaign rally, asking people to call Graham.

In December 2015, Trump, the front-runner for the Republican presidential nomination, called for a ban on Muslims entering the United States. Graham, who had very little support as a presidential candidate, responded: "He's a race-baiting, xenophobic, religious bigot ... He doesn't represent my [Republican] party ... I don't think he has a clue about anything ... He is empowering radical Islam ... You know how you make America great again? Tell Donald Trump to go to hell." He added, "I'd rather lose without Donald Trump than try to win with him."

In May 2016 Graham tweeted, "If we nominate Trump, we will get destroyed...and we will deserve it."

In June 2016, after Trump criticized a judge of Mexican heritage, implying he could be biased, Graham said to CNN: "I don't think [Trump is] racist but he's playing the race card ... I think it's very un-American ... If he continues this line of attack then I think people really need to reconsider the future of the [Republican] party." Graham told The New York Times that that incident "is probably it" for anyone looking to withdraw their support of Trump: "There'll come a time when the love of country will trump hatred of Hillary Clinton", the Democratic nominee for president.

In the November presidential election, Graham did not vote for Trump, saying, "I couldn’t go where Donald Trump wanted to take the USA & GOP." He voted for independent candidate Evan McMullin.

In March 2017, Graham held a meeting with Trump. Graham said that the meeting went so well that he passed his new phone number to Trump, in reference to their 2015 conflict. In October 2017, Graham and Trump played golf together on multiple occasions, with Graham praising the first outing. In November 2017, Graham criticized the media's reporting on Trump: "What concerns me about the American press is this endless, endless attempt to label the guy some kind of kook not fit to be president." (In February 2016, Graham said of Trump: "I think he's a kook. I think he's crazy. I think he's unfit for office.")

In April 2018, Graham said that he would support Trump's reelection in 2020. In January 2019, Graham said that Republicans must support Trump's policies: "If we undercut the president, that’s the end of his presidency and the end of our party."

In February 2019 Mark Leibovich interviewed Graham for The New York Times Magazine. He asked Graham how he became a prominent Trump supporter. Graham responded that he was attempting "to be relevant": "I've got an opportunity up here working with the president to get some really good outcomes for the country ... I have never been called this much by a president in my life ... He's asked me to do some things, and I’ve asked him to do some things in return." Graham said he had been gaining influence with Trump and was attempting to enter Trump's inner circle, where he would reach a level of influence on par with Melania Trump, Ivanka Trump and Jared Kushner. He said that he had had a "political marriage" with John McCain, but as for his relationship with Trump: "I personally like him. We play golf. He’s very nice to me." Graham also said that a good relationship with Trump would help his prospects of reelection to the Senate in 2020.

Seven months after the death of McCain, one of Graham's "dearest friends", Trump repeatedly criticized McCain. Graham was then criticized for not standing up for McCain. Graham responded, "To all those people who bring up this narrative, you just hate Trump ... You're not offended about me and McCain; you're trying to use me to get to Trump ... I'm not into this idea that the only way to honor John McCain is to trash out Trump." He also said, "The bottom line here is I'm going to help President Trump." McCain had banned Trump from his funeral. Trump's daughter Ivanka attended his funeral, reportedly at the invitation of Graham, who had reportedly gotten McCain's wife's permission. According to Graham, Trump called him after he delivered an emotional farewell to McCain on the Senate floor, telling him he "did right by his friend."

On May 14, 2019, Graham came under scrutiny, including from Senator Joe Manchin, after encouraging Donald Trump Jr. to ignore a subpoena delivered by the Senate Intelligence Committee.

In July 2019, Graham said he did not think Trump was racist and that he did not think that Trump's statements that certain Democratic congresswomen should "go back and help fix the totally broken and crime infested places from which they came" were racist. Graham said, "I don't think a Somali refugee embracing Trump would be asked to go back. If you're racist, you want everybody to go back because they are black or Muslim." Earlier in August 2018, The Washington Post reported that Graham had said, "I have never heard him make a single racist statement. Not even close."

On October 8, 2019, during an interview with Jonathan Swan of Axios, Graham condemned Trump's announcement of an intention to withdraw U.S. troops from northern Syria, saying that Trump was putting the nation and his presidency at risk, and that it was without the support of key national security advisers. Media focused on Graham's reversals and Trump's apparent lack of appreciation for his advice.

In December 2019, as two articles of impeachment against Trump moved to a vote before the full House and referral to the Senate for trial, Graham said, "I am trying to give a pretty clear signal I have made up my mind. I'm not trying to pretend to be a fair juror here", adding, "this thing will come to the Senate, and it will die quickly, and I will do everything I can to make it die quickly." He also announced that he held "disdain for the accusations and the process. So I don't need any witnesses" for the Senate trial. In response, Democrats referenced statements Graham made during the 1998 impeachment of Bill Clinton, including his citation of Richard Nixon as proof that a president who ignored a subpoena should be impeached for taking "the power from Congress over the impeachment process away from Congress" and becoming "judge and jury" himself.

Reaction to 2020 presidential election results

Even after all major news networks projected that Joe Biden had won the 2020 United States presidential election, Graham said that Trump "should not concede" because "if Republicans don't challenge and change the U.S. election system, there will never be another Republican president elected again". Graham said he donated $500,000 to Trump's election lawsuits in various states, and that the option should be "on the table" for Republican state legislators to invalidate election results due to alleged "corruption" by appointing presidential electors who would vote for Trump.

After receiving an affidavit by Pennsylvania postal worker Richard Hopkins alleging that his postmaster discussed backdating mail ballots, Graham issued a statement that "all credible allegations of voting irregularities and misconduct be investigated to ensure the integrity of the 2020 elections", including Hopkins's. Hopkins's affidavit was released by Project Veritas, a controversial conservative organization known for using deceptive tactics; Project Veritas later released a recording in which Hopkins says that he did not hear his postmaster explicitly discuss backdating ballots, and that Project Veritas wrote his affidavit for him.

The 2020 United States presidential election in Georgia produced an initial count where Biden defeated Trump by around 14,000 votes, triggering a recount due to the small margin. While the recount was ongoing, Graham privately called the Georgia Secretary of State, Brad Raffensperger to discuss Georgia's vote counting. Raffensperger, a Republican, told The Washington Post that Graham had asked Raffensperger whether Raffensperger could disqualify all mail-in ballots in counties with more signature errors. Gabriel Sterling, a Republican election official and staffer to Raffensperger, was present on the call; Sterling confirmed that Graham had asked that question. Raffensperger viewed Graham's question as a suggestion to throw out legally cast ballots. Graham denied suggesting this. Graham acknowledged calling Raffensperger to find out how to "protect the integrity of mail-in voting" and "how does signature verification work", but said that if Raffensperger "feels threatened by that conversation, he’s got a problem". Graham said that he was investigating in his capacity as a senator, although he was the chair of the Senate Judiciary Committee. He went on to claim that he had also spoken to Arizona's and Nevada's secretaries of state. Those secretaries denied this, and Graham reversed himself, saying that he had spoken to the governor of Arizona and no official in Nevada. The Washington Post reported in February 2021 that Fani Willis, the Fulton County, Georgia district attorney, was examining Graham's phone call to Raffensperger as part of a criminal investigation into possible efforts to illegally overturn Georgia's election results.

On January 6, 2021, Graham, Vice President Mike Pence, and members of the Senate and House were evacuated from the Capitol building after Trump supporters attacked the United States Capitol. The joint session of Congress reconvened late into the night and the early morning in the Senate chamber to count and confirm the Electoral College votes. Graham spoke, disagreeing with many of his Republican colleagues, who mostly supported Trump's denials of the election's results, saying, "it's a uniquely bad idea to delay this election", and though "I hate it", they could "count me out, enough is enough". He finished by saying, "Joe Biden and Kamala Harris are lawfully elected and will become the President and the Vice President of the United States on January the 20th."

In the resulting second impeachment trial of Donald Trump, Graham voted "not guilty".

On May 28, 2021, Graham voted against creating the January 6 commission.

In August 2021, The New York Times reported that Graham called Biden days after the election in an effort to revive their friendship and told Biden he had called for a special counsel investigation of Biden's son Hunter during the campaign only to appease Trump supporters among his constituents. A Graham spokesman disputed the Times's account.

2024 election 
Graham appeared at Trump's first prime-time 2024 campaign rally on January 28, 2023, and told Fox News host Sean Hannity that he would support Trump "because I know what I'm going to get", mostly regarding perceived international threats.

Political positions

Tea Party opponents have called Graham a "moderate Republican." He calls himself a "Reagan-style Republican", and has been called a fairly conservative Republican with "a twang of moderation" and "an independent streak."

Much of the Tea Party criticism focuses on his willingness to be bipartisan and work with Democrats on issues like climate change, tax reform and immigration reform and his belief that judicial nominees should not be opposed solely because of their philosophical positions. He voted to confirm both of President Obama's Supreme Court nominees, Sonia Sotomayor and Elena Kagan. For his part, Graham has criticized and confronted the Tea Party, arguing for a more inclusive Republican Party. In the first session of the 115th Congress, Graham was ranked the sixth most bipartisan senator by the Lugar Center and Georgetown's McCourt School of Public Policy.

Supreme Court nominations 

In 2016, after Supreme Court Justice Antonin Scalia died, Republican senators boycotted Obama's nomination of Merrick Garland. Graham said that Supreme Court vacancies should never be filled in a presidential election year and that "[w]e are setting a precedent today, Republicans are." He said that if a similar situation arose, "you can use my words against me and you'd be absolutely right." In an October 2018 interview, Graham said specifically that "[i]f an opening comes in the last year of President Trump's term, and the primary process has started, we'll wait till the next election."

During the 2018 confirmation hearings following Brett Kavanaugh's nomination to the Supreme Court of the United States, Graham took a strong stance against letting the process be further delayed by Christine Blasey Ford's allegations. Ford accused Kavanaugh of sexually assaulting her decades earlier when the two were in high school. Speaking to reporters immediately after the Senate Judiciary Committee questioned Ford, Graham declared himself unmoved by her testimony, doubting her recollection that it was Kavanaugh who had assaulted her.

When Kavanaugh testified before the committee the following day, Graham used his time to speak in Kavanaugh's defense, describing him as a victim who had been put through "hell" by "the most unethical sham" he had seen in his time in politics and that if Kavanaugh was looking for fair process, he had "c[o]me to the wrong town at the wrong time". A CNN commentator characterized Graham's speech as an "audition" for Attorney General.

In 2019, Graham became chair of the Judiciary Committee. In May 2020, Graham said the Senate would work to confirm a Supreme Court nominee if a vacancy arose before the November election. He said "Merrick Garland was a different situation. You had the president of one party nominating, and you had the Senate in the hands of the other party. A situation where you've got them both would be different." In August 2020, he said "[a]fter Kavanaugh's confirmation, the rules have changed as far as I'm concerned."

In September 2020, Supreme Court justice Ruth Bader Ginsburg died. Within a day, Graham expressed support for the Senate immediately voting on Trump's nominee to succeed her. The New York Times called Graham's position "a complete and brazen reversal" of his earlier stance. Graham said that in 2013, years before his 2016 pledge, Democrats had changed Senate rules to allow a simple majority vote for nominees to United States courts of appeals.

Free speech

During an April 3, 2011, appearance on Face the Nation, Graham "suggested that Congress take unspecified though formal action against the Koran-burning by Florida preacher Terry Jones", in light of an attack on United Nations personnel triggered by Jones's actions. Asserting that "Congress might need to explore the need to limit some forms of freedom of speech", Graham argued, "Free speech is a great idea, but we're in a war," and claimed that "during World War II, we had limits on what you could say if it would inspire the enemy."

Gang of 14
On May 23, 2005, Graham was one of the so-called Gang of 14 senators forging a compromise that brought a halt to the continued blockage of an up-or-down vote on judicial nominees. This compromise negated both the Democrats' use of a filibuster and the Republican "nuclear option". Under the agreement, the Democrats retained the power to filibuster a Bush judicial nominee only in an "extraordinary circumstance", and subsequently, three conservative Bush appellate court nominees (Janice Rogers Brown, Priscilla Owen and William H. Pryor Jr.) received a vote by the full Senate.

National Security Agency surveillance
In response to the 2013 disclosures about the United States National Security Agency and its international partners' global surveillance of foreign nationals and U.S. citizens, Graham said he was "glad" the NSA was collecting phone records. He said, "I'm a Verizon customer. I don't mind Verizon turning over records to the government if the government is going to make sure that they try to match up a known terrorist phone with somebody in the United States. I don't think you're talking to the terrorists. I know you're not. I know I'm not. So we don't have anything to worry about."

On July 25, 2013, the U.S. Senate Committee on Appropriations unanimously adopted an amendment by Graham to the Fiscal Year 2014 Department of State, Foreign Operations, and Related Programs Appropriations Bill that sought sanctions against any country that offered asylum to former NSA contractor Edward Snowden.

Detainee interrogations
In July 2005, Graham secured the declassification and release of memoranda outlining concerns made by senior military lawyers as early as 2003 about the legality of the interrogations of prisoners held at Guantanamo Bay.

Of U.S. citizens accused of supporting terrorism, Graham said before the Senate, "When they say, 'I want my lawyer,' you tell them, 'Shut up. You don't get a lawyer. You are an enemy combatant, and we are going to talk to you about why you joined Al Qaeda.'" In response to this and a June 2004 U.S. Supreme Court decision allowing detainees to file habeas corpus petitions to challenge their detentions, Graham authored an amendment to a Department of Defense Authorization Act attempting to clarify the authority of American courts. The amendment passed in November 2005 by a vote of 49–42 in the Senate despite opposition from human rights groups and legal scholars who contended that it limited the rights of detainees.

Graham has said he amended the Department of Defense Authorization Act in order to give military lawyers, as opposed to politically appointed lawyers, a more independent role in the oversight of military commanders. He has argued that two of the largest problems leading to the detainee abuse scandals at Guantanamo Bay and Abu Ghraib were this lack of oversight and troops' confusion over legal boundaries.

Graham added that military lawyers had long observed the provisions of the Uniform Code of Military Justice and the Geneva Convention, but that the Bush administration had not considered those provisions in decisions about the treatment of Guantanamo Bay detainees. He claimed that better legal oversight within the military's chain of command would prevent future detainee abuse.

In February 2006, Graham joined Senator Jon Kyl in filing an amicus brief in the Hamdan v. Rumsfeld case that argued "Congress was aware" that the Detainee Treatment Act of 2005 would strip the Supreme Court of jurisdiction to hear "pending cases, including this case" brought by Guantanamo detainees.

In a May 2009 CNN interview, Graham referred to the domestic internment of German and Japanese prisoners of war and U.S. Citizens as a model for domestic detention of Guantanamo detainees, saying, "We had 450,000 Japanese and German prisoners housed in the United States during World War II. As a nation, we can deal with this."

Immigration reform
Graham was a supporter of "comprehensive immigration reform", of S. 2611, the McCain-Kennedy Immigration Reform Bill of 2006, and of S. 1348, the Comprehensive Immigration Reform Act of 2007. His positions on immigration, and in particular collaborating with Senator Ted Kennedy, earned Graham the ire of conservative activists. The controversy prompted conservative activists to support a primary challenge in 2008 by longtime Republican national committeeman Buddy Witherspoon, but Graham won the nomination by a large margin.　

In early 2010, Graham began working with Democratic New York Senator Chuck Schumer on immigration reform. The talks broke down later that year.

In July 2010, Graham suggested that U.S. citizenship as a birthright guaranteed by the 14th Amendment of the U.S. Constitution should be amended, and that any children born to illegal immigrants in the United States should be considered illegal immigrants. He alleged, "Half the children born in hospitals on our borders are the children of illegal immigrants."

In November 2012, Graham and Schumer resumed their talks on comprehensive immigration reform. On January 28, 2013, Graham was a member of a bipartisan group of eight senators that announced principles for comprehensive immigration reform. On June 23, 2013, Graham said that the Senate was close to obtaining 70 votes to pass the reform package.

In May 2019, Graham proposed instituting new immigration laws that would only allow migrants to apply for asylum from their home country or Mexico, smooth the process to deport unaccompanied children to Central America, and extend the period by which migrant children could be detained from 20 days to 100 days.

In July 2019, Graham visited a migrant detention center in Texas. He reacted that it was not "a concentration camp" but "a facility overwhelmed". Of the migrants, Graham said, "I don’t care if they have to stay in these facilities for 400 days. We're not going to let those men go that I saw. It would be dangerous."

Internet and technology 
In May 2018, Graham voted against legislation that would have overturned the FCC's ruling and restored net neutrality.

In March 2017, Graham voted for the Broadband Consumer Privacy Proposal that removed the FCC's internet privacy rules and allowed internet service providers to sell customers' browsing history without their permission.

In February 2022, Graham and Richard Blumenthal introduced bipartisan legislation, as part of the EARN IT Act, to incentivize tech companies to remove child sexual abuse material (CSAM) from their platforms and remove blanket immunity for violations of laws related to online child pornography.

Gun rights
Graham opposes extending background checks. He has said, "universal background checks are going to require universal [gun] registration." However, he has called current gun laws "broken", citing an example of a woman who pleaded guilty by reason of insanity to attempting to kill President George W. Bush, but who was later able to pass a background check and buy a gun. To this end, in March 2013, he joined Senators Jeff Flake, Mark Begich, and Mark Pryor in introducing a bill that would close a loophole by flagging individuals who attempt to buy guns who have used an insanity defense, were ruled dangerous by a court or had been committed by a court to mental health treatment. It did not address the gun show loophole.

In 2022, Graham became one of ten Republican senators to support a bipartisan agreement on gun control, which included a red flag provision, a support for state crisis intervention orders, funding for school safety resources, stronger background checks for buyers under the age of 21, and penalties for straw purchases.

Health care
Graham opposed President Obama's health reform legislation; he voted against the Affordable Care Act (Obamacare) in December 2009, and against the Health Care and Education Reconciliation Act of 2010. He played a leading role in efforts to repeal Obamacare, authoring the Graham–Cassidy amendment to Republicans' 2017 repeal efforts. The amendment would have given states permission to remove protections for individuals with preexisting conditions, such as allowing insurers to charge them higher prices for insurance.

Graham is a cosponsor of the Healthy Americans Act.

Vaccines
Graham criticized Senator Rand Paul after Paul said, "I've heard of many tragic cases of walking, talking, normal children who wound up with profound mental disorders after vaccines." Graham said that Paul was "creating anxiety for no good reason" and "looking at this issue through a libertarian's eyes, not a physician's eyes".

Graham continued:

Abortion
In 2015, Graham sponsored the Pain-Capable Unborn Child Protection Act in the Senate, which bans abortion after 20 weeks of gestation on a national basis, with some exceptions (to save the life of the mother, or when the pregnancy is the result of rape or incest). In 2018, Graham was anti-abortion, but said that Roe v. Wade is precedent that should not be overturned without good reason. In 2020, he was one of 13 Republican senators who declined to sign an amicus brief asking the Supreme Court to overturn Roe.

In May 2022, Graham advocated that the Supreme Court overturn Roe to ensure that "every state will decide if abortion is legal and on what terms", as this would be "the most constitutionally sound way of dealing with this issue and the way the United States handled the issue until 1973." In June 2022, he asserted that all conservatives "believed that there's nothing in the Constitution giving the federal government the right to regulate abortion". In August 2022, Graham said that "states should decide the issue of abortion" and that he had "been consistent" on this.

In September 2022, Graham introduced legislation in an attempt to institute a federal ban on abortion after 15 weeks of pregnancy with exceptions for rape, incest, and the life of the patient. Graham said: "This is not a states' rights issue. This is a human right issue ... I am going to advocate a national minimum standard."

LGBTQ+ rights
In 1996, Graham voted for the Defense of Marriage Act, which became federal law that year; it defined marriage as between one man and one woman, and enacted non-recognition of same-sex marriages at the federal level. Graham reiterated his support of the Defense of Marriage Act in 2022.

Graham voted to support a constitutional amendment opposing marriage between same-sex couples in 2006. He said, "I believe in the traditional definition of marriage as being between one man and one woman. Traditional marriage is an institution worth protecting and this amendment will accomplish that goal. A constitutional amendment is the only effective way to cut off the growing trend among judges to create a constitutional right to same-sex marriage." After the Supreme Court ruling in Obergefell v. Hodges, Graham said that although he disagreed with the ruling, he no longer believed that a constitutional amendment was a viable action on the issue.

In August 2022, after the House of Representatives approved a bill to recognize same-sex marriages at the federal level and that bill was sent to the Senate, Graham said that "states should decide the issue of marriage [...] if you're going to ask me to have the federal government take over defining marriage, I'm going to say no".

Climate change
On December 10, 2009, Graham and Senators John Kerry and Joe Lieberman co-sponsored a letter to President Obama announcing their commitment to passing a climate change bill and outlining its framework. Graham was identified as a potential Republican supporter of a climate change bill and thought to be a likely sponsor of the final bill, but he pulled his support, saying that he disapproved of Senate Democrats moving forward with legislation to deal with immigration issues, a reaction to Arizona's passage of an illegal immigration law. Graham's withdrawal of support left passage of the climate change bill in doubt.

In June 2010, Graham told reporters, "The science about global warming has changed. I think they've oversold this stuff, quite frankly. I think they've been alarmist and the science is in question. The whole movement has taken a giant step backward." He also said that he planned to vote against the climate bill he had originally co-sponsored, citing further restriction of offshore drilling added to the bill and its impact on transportation. In 2015, Graham said he "completely understand[s] and accept[s]" that climate change is real, but said "I don't know" the role human activity played.

In 2020, Graham sponsored the Growing Climate Solutions Act, a bill that would make it simpler for farmers to sell carbon credits on existing carbon trading markets in California and in the Northeast.

Foreign policy
Graham supports an interventionist foreign policy. In 2002, he voted for the Iraq Resolution, which authorized military action against Iraq. He also supported the invasion of Iraq. Graham and Senators John McCain and Joe Lieberman, who were frequently dubbed "the three amigos", traveled widely, pushing for American military intervention, particularly after the September 11 attacks. Their influence reached its zenith in 2007 as President Bush advocated for his surge strategy in Iraq, declining shortly before Lieberman retired from the Senate in 2013. Kelly Ayotte, who joined the Senate in 2011, was considered Lieberman's replacement in the group.

Graham was a frequent critic of the foreign policy of the Barack Obama administration. He threatened to derail the confirmation of Obama's nominee for secretary of defense, Chuck Hagel, remarking that Hagel "would be the most antagonistic secretary of defense towards the state of Israel in our nation's history."

On February 28, 2013, Graham criticized Obama and both political parties on the Senate floor for allowing the budget reduction to occur with "two-thirds of the budget" exempt from reductions and said the impact on the Department of Defense would create a "hollow military" that "invites aggression".

War in Afghanistan 

Graham suggested that the U.S. stay in Afghanistan permanently, claiming that this would benefit both nations, as the U.S. would have a clear idea of what was happening in the region on a daily basis, and Afghan security forces would have an edge militarily to ensure that Afghanistan never fell back into the hands of the Taliban. He further claimed that Afghan leaders accept this long-term U.S. military presence since it benefits them, but Iran and some of its allies oppose it, a debatable claim.

Graham vehemently opposed Joe Biden's plan to withdraw all U.S. troops from Afghanistan. He suggested that this plan puts the U.S. in danger and could cause "another 9/11". Soon after the withdrawal of U.S. troops started, the Taliban launched an offensive against the Afghan government, quickly advancing in front of a collapsing Afghan Armed Forces. On July 8, 2021, Graham called President Biden's decision a "disaster in the making."

Iran 
On November 6, 2010, Graham called for a preemptive military strike to weaken the Iranian regime. In 2011, he supported a continuing U.S. military presence in Iraq, saying, "If we're not smart enough to work with the Iraqis to have 10,000 to 15,000 American troops in Iraq in 2012, Iraq could go to hell."

On an episode of Fox and Friends, Graham joked that it would be "terrible" if a DNA test showed he had Iranian ancestry. Co-host Brian Kilmeade responded, "Well, they have great people, just bad leaders," which Graham confirmed. The president of the National Iranian American Council and a number of high-profile Iranian-Americans criticized Graham's comments.

Russia 
In December 2010, Graham was one of 26 senators to vote against the ratification of New Start, a nuclear arms reduction treaty between the U.S. and the Russian Federation obliging both countries to have no more than 1,550 strategic warheads or 700 launchers deployed during the next seven years along with providing a continuation of on-site inspections that halted when START I expired the previous year. It was the first arms treaty with Russia in eight years.

In August 2011, Graham co-sponsored a resolution that contended that "Russia's invasion of Georgian land in 2008 was an act of aggression, not only to Georgia but to all new democracies."

On July 16, 2013, Graham suggested the United States should consider boycotting the 2014 Winter Olympics in Sochi, Russia, because of "what the Russian government is doing throughout the world".

On March 3, 2022, Graham tweeted that "The only way this ends is for somebody in Russia to take this guy out" in response to the 2022 Russian invasion of Ukraine. The tweet sparked controversy after Graham called for the assassination of Vladimir Putin.

Libya 
Graham supported the NATO-led military intervention in Libya. On January 29, 2013, Graham said that Secretary of State Hillary Clinton "got away with murder" after her testimony about the 2012 Benghazi attack, but the next year he said that the House Intelligence Committee report on Benghazi was "full of crap" and that the Obama administration had been cleared of many of the charges therein.

Israel/Palestine 

On January 5, 2017, Graham condemned Obama for abstaining from UN Security Council Resolution 2334, which condemned Israeli settlement building in the West Bank and eastern Jerusalem as a violation of international law.

On March 11, 2019, Graham said he would encourage the Trump administration to recognize the Golan Heights as part of Israel.

Venezuela 
In May 2019, Graham called for a military invasion of Venezuela to overthrow Nicolás Maduro amid the 2019 Venezuelan presidential crisis.

Niger 
In October 2017, in the wake of the Tongo Tongo ambush, which killed four U.S. soldiers, Graham said, "I didn't know there was a thousand troops in Niger." A few days later, he called for an expanded role of the U.S. military in Niger: "You're going to see more actions in Africa, not less; you're going to see more aggression by the United States toward our enemies, not less; you're going to have decisions being made not in the White House but out in the field."

Syria 
In July 2018, Graham and Senator Jeanne Shaheen visited Manbij in Syria, and met the Manbij Military Council, which led an offensive to liberate the city from ISIS in 2016 with help from the US-led coalition.

Saudi Arabia 
In March 2015, Graham supported the Saudi Arabian-led intervention in Yemen, saying, "We want to have a relationship with Saudi Arabia. They're a strategic partner. They're a mortal enemy of the Iranians." In June 2019, he was one of seven Republicans to vote to block Trump's Saudi arms deal providing weapons to Saudi Arabia, United Arab Emirates and Jordan, and one of five Republicans to vote against an additional 20 arms sales. In late 2019, Graham took a warmer approach toward Saudi Arabia. He praised the Trump administration for sending thousands of additional troops to Saudi Arabia to counter Iran's threat. He also praised Saudi Arabia for opening its airspace to Israeli flights.

Turkey

In October 2019, Graham said he would "introduce bipartisan sanctions against Turkey if they invade Syria" and that he would "call for their suspension from NATO if they attack Kurdish forces who assisted the US in the destruction of the ISIS Caliphate."

Armenian genocide 
In November 2019, Graham blocked a Senate resolution to officially recognize the Armenian genocide. In December 2019, he voted for the resolution, which passed the Senate unanimously.

Robert Mueller's investigation 

In January 2018, and in the first known congressional criminal referral in the investigation into Russian interference in the 2016 election, Graham and Chuck Grassley recommended charges against ex-MI6 officer Christopher Steele, named as author of the Steele dossier. Grassley and Graham said that they had reason to believe that Steele had lied to federal authorities. According to The New York Times, "It was not clear why, if a crime is apparent in the F.B.I. reports that were reviewed by the Judiciary Committee, the Justice Department had not moved to charge Mr. Steele already. The circumstances under which Mr. Steele is alleged to have lied were unclear, as much of the referral was classified."

In April 2018, after the FBI raid on the hotel room and offices of Trump's personal attorney, Michael Cohen, Graham, Cory Booker, Chris Coons, and Thom Tillis introduced new legislation to "limit President Trump's ability to fire special counsel Robert Mueller." Termed the Special Counsel Independence and Integrity Act, the legislation would allow any special counsel, in this case Mueller, receive an "expedited judicial review" in the 10 days after being dismissed to determine whether the dismissal was appropriate. If not, the special counsel would be reinstated. At the same time, according to The Hill, the bill would "codify regulations" that a special counsel could only be fired by a senior Justice Department official, having to provide reasons in writing.

On March 14, 2019, Graham blocked a resolution calling for Mueller's report to be made public after it passed the House unanimously.

After Mueller's testimony to two congressional committees on July 24, 2019, Graham speculated that "the Mueller report is in name only. It clearly wasn't the Mueller report. It was just in name." On June 25, 2019, Graham said, "The president gave 1.4 million documents to Mueller. [Don] McGahn, his lawyer, testified for 30 hours. He made everybody available to Mueller that Mueller wanted to talk to, and he... answered questions in writing, so this president did nothing to stop Mueller from finding the truth."

Taxation
Although Graham signed Grover Norquist's Taxpayer Protection Pledge in June 2012, he went on record supporting the closure of tax loopholes without compensating decreases in other tax revenue, saying, "We're so far in debt that if you don't give up some ideological ground, the country sinks."

Trade
The Cato Institute's Center for Trade Policy Studies identifies Graham, during his U.S. House and U.S. Senate tenure, as having a mostly protectionist and pro-subsidies voting record.

2015 Charleston church shooting and Confederate flag issue
After a multiple shooting incident at an historic African American church in Charleston on June 17, 2015, Graham canceled all campaign events to return to South Carolina. In response to questions from the press regarding the calls from some to remove the Confederate flag at a war memorial on the South Carolina State Capitol grounds, Graham said, "Well, at the end of the day it's time for people in South Carolina to revisit that decision. [That] would be fine with me, but this is part of who we are." He continued, "The flag represents to some people a civil war, and that was the symbol of one side. To others it's a racist symbol, and it's been used by people—it's been used in a racist way." Of the shooter responsible for the incident, Graham said, "We're not going to give this a guy an excuse about a book he might have read, or a movie he watched, or a song he listened to, or a symbol out anywhere. It's him ... not the flag."

In a statement issued later, Graham said, "There can be no doubt that the shooting ... was racially motivated and signals to all of us that the scars of our history are still with us today. This murderer said he wanted to start a race war; he has failed miserably. In Charleston this weekend, I saw a community coming together. I saw people seeking solace in what they share together, not in what makes them different."

Campaign contributions 

In 2016, The Boston Globe reported that Graham was "the only Republican recipient of money from a major Democratic donor now facing scrutiny for some questionable campaign donation habits." The Thornton Law Firm is nationally known for its expertise in asbestos-related litigation. Over a ten-year period, Graham received $62,800 in campaign contributions from the firm's partners. The Boston Globe found that the firm, in almost every case, would reimburse partners' political contributions—in the exact amount—within 10 days of the contributions being made. Between 2010 and 2014, the firm's partners and one of their wives contributed $1.6 million to politicians; $1.4 million was given back to the partners from the firm. The firm told reporters that according to outside consultants the practice was not unlawful because the checks are not bonuses, instead coming out of the partners' firm equity accounts.

A spokesman for Graham said that Graham would return the money he received from the firm's lawyers if the law firm were indicted or convicted on corruption charges.

Presidential politics

Graham supported John McCain for president in 2000 and served as national co-chair of McCain's 2008 presidential campaign.

In 2012, Graham's endorsement was highly sought, but he declined to endorse a Republican candidate before the January South Carolina Republican primary. After Rick Santorum withdrew from the race in April 2012, leaving Mitt Romney as the presumptive nominee, Graham endorsed Romney.

During his Senate reelection race in October 2014, while discussing immigration and foreign policy issues with a reporter from The Weekly Standard, Graham said, "If I get through my general election, if nobody steps up in the presidential mix, if nobody's out there talking ... I may just jump in to get to make these arguments." On March 7, 2015, at a "Politics and Pies" forum, Graham advocated the reversal of defense spending cuts and quipped: "If I were President of the United States, I wouldn't let Congress leave town until we fix this. I would literally use the military to keep them in if I had to."

On April 19, 2015, Graham told Chris Wallace, on the Fox News Sunday show, that he was "91% sure" he would run for president. "If I can raise the money, I'll do it," he said. On May 18, 2015, Graham informally announced that he would run for president on CBS This Morning, saying he was running because he thinks "the world is falling apart."

Graham announced his candidacy for President on June 1, 2015.

On December 21, 2015, Graham suspended his presidential campaign, due to lack of support and poor polling, and on January 15, 2016, endorsed former Florida Governor Jeb Bush. After it appeared certain that Donald Trump would become the Republican nominee in May 2016, Graham announced that he would not vote for Trump or Hillary Clinton, commenting: "I think Donald Trump is going to places where very few people have gone and I'm not going with him." On November 8, 2016, Graham announced that he had voted for Evan McMullin.

Electoral history

*Write-in and minor candidate notes: In 1994, write-ins received 13 votes.  In 2000, Natural Law candidate LeRoy J. Klein received 1,122 votes and write-ins received 33 votes.  George Brightharp ran under both the Democratic and United Citizens Parties and received 2,253 votes on the United Citizen line.

Primary elections

Personal life
Graham has never been married and has no children. He helped raise his sister, Darline Graham Nordone, after the deaths of his mother and father, which occurred within 15 months of each other, leaving the two without parents when Graham was 22 and she was 13. Graham has said that his parents' early deaths made him mature more quickly, and Nordone, who introduced her brother at his 2016 announcement of his candidacy for president, said she hoped to be with him on the campaign trail frequently to show voters his softer side. "He's kind of like a brother, a father and a mother rolled into one," she said. "I've always looked up to Lindsey."

Graham lives in Seneca, South Carolina. A Southern Baptist, he is a member of the Corinth Baptist Church.

On August 8, 2021, Graham became the first fully vaccinated senator to test positive for COVID-19.

See also
 Conspiracy theories related to the Trump–Ukraine scandal
 Republican Party presidential candidates, 2016

References

Further reading
 "Swing Conservative: The perilous bipartisanship of Lindsey Graham.", Washington Monthly, April 2005.
 "The American Ghosts of Abu Ghraib", Sam Provance, Consortium News, March 2007.
 "Lindsey Graham: Not a Nuclear Wussypants", Kate Sheppard, Mother Jones, October 2009.
 "As the World Burns", Ryan Lizza, The New Yorker, October 2010.
 "Lindsey Graham: The Senate's Republican Deal Maker", Matthew Kaminski, The Wall Street Journal, June 2013.
 "Who can beat Lindsey Graham?", Peter Hamby, CNN, August 2013.
 "Lindsey Graham Stares Down the Tea Party" , Corey Hutchins, Free Times, April 2014.

External links

 Senator Lindsey Graham official U.S. Senate website
 Campaign website
 

 

|-

|-

|-

|-

|-

|-

|-

|-

1955 births
20th-century American politicians
20th-century Baptists
21st-century American politicians
21st-century Baptists
American Christian Zionists
American military lawyers
United States Air Force personnel of the Iraq War
American prosecutors
Baptists from South Carolina
Baptists from the United States
Candidates in the 2016 United States presidential election
International Republican Institute
United States Air Force Judge Advocate General's Corps
Living people
Republican Party members of the South Carolina House of Representatives
People from Central, South Carolina
Recipients of the Meritorious Service Medal (United States)
Republican Party members of the United States House of Representatives from South Carolina
Republican Party United States senators from South Carolina
South Carolina lawyers
South Carolina National Guard personnel
Southern Baptists
United States Air Force colonels
University of South Carolina alumni
People from Oconee County, South Carolina
Articles containing video clips
Recipients of the Order of Prince Yaroslav the Wise, 3rd class